Shatarupa is the daughter of the creator deity, Brahma. According to Brahma Purana, Shatarupa is regarded as the first woman to be created by Brahma, marrying Manu, the first man. Their descendants are called manushya, the Sanskrit term for mankind.

Literature 
The Bhagavata Purana mentions the birth of Shatarupa, and her marriage to Manu:

In other texts, it is the manasaputra, the mind-born children of Brahma, who are believed to have created the first man, Svayambhuva Manu, and the first woman, Shatarupa.

Shatarupa marries Svayambhuva, and the couple had five children — two sons, Priyavrata and Uttānapāda, and three daughters, Ākūti, Devahūti, and Prasuti. Manu handed over his first daughter Ākūti to the sage Ruci, the middle daughter, Devahūti, to the Prajapati Kardama, and the youngest, Prasūti, to Daksha.

See also
Manu
Manasaputra
Prajapati

References

External links
Brahma Purana

Legendary progenitors
Mythological first humans
Hindu mythology